Loch McNess (Nyoongar:Wagardu Lark), also known as Yanchep Lake, is a freshwater lake located near Yanchep in the northern part of the coastal plain of Perth, Western Australia. Loch McNess is part of the Wanneroo wetlands, a chain of lakes, and is part of the Yanchep National Park. Water from the lake is used to refill the underground lakes in some nearby caves.

Description
The lake is named after Sir Charles McNess, a wealthy Western Australian philanthropist.

Galaxiidae (fish) and Gilgies (freshwater crayfish) are endemic to the region. Introduced species include mosquitofish (Gambusia).

CSIRO study nutrients and plankton in the lake.

The lake is also known as Wagardu Lark by the Nyoongar aboriginals and along with the caves is of significant cultural importance.

Since European colonisation of the area and specifically with the building of Gloucester Lodge on its shores in 1933 it has traditionally been used for boating outings.  There is no longer sufficient water in the lake for boating.

See also

 List of lakes of Western Australia

References

Lakes of Perth, Western Australia
Wanneroo wetlands